In signal processing, cross-correlation is a measure of similarity of two series as a function of the displacement of one relative to the other. This is also known as a sliding dot product or sliding inner-product. It is commonly used for searching a long signal for a shorter, known feature. It has applications in pattern recognition, single particle analysis, electron tomography, averaging, cryptanalysis, and neurophysiology. The cross-correlation is similar in nature to the convolution of two functions.  In an autocorrelation, which is the cross-correlation of a signal with itself, there will always be a peak at a lag of zero, and its size will be the signal energy.

In probability and statistics, the definition of correlation always includes a standardising factor in such a way that correlations have values between −1 and +1.

Cross-correlation of deterministic signals

Specifically,  can be circular translation transform, rotation transform, or scale transform, etc. The kernel cross-correlation extends cross-correlation from linear space to kernel space. Cross-correlation is equivariant to translation; kernel cross-correlation is equivariant to any affine transforms, including translation, rotation, and scale, etc.

Explanation
As an example, consider two real valued functions  and  differing only by an unknown shift along the x-axis. The formula essentially slides the  function along the x-axis, calculating the integral of their product at each position. This is because when peaks (positive areas) are aligned, they make a large contribution to the integral. Similarly, when troughs (negative areas) align, they also make a positive contribution to the integral because the product of two negative numbers is positive.

In econometrics, lagged cross-correlation is sometimes referred to as cross-autocorrelation.

Properties

Cross-correlation of random vectors

Definition
Written component-wise:The random vectors  and  need not have the same dimension, and either might be a scalar value.

Example

Definition for complex random vectors

Cross-correlation of stochastic processes
In time series analysis and statistics, the cross-correlation of a pair of random process is the correlation between values of the processes at different times, as a function of the two times. Let  be a pair of random processes, and  be any point in time ( may be an integer for a discrete-time process or a real number for a continuous-time process). Then  is the value (or realization) produced by a given run of the process at time .

Cross-correlation function 
Then the definition of the cross-correlation between times  and  iswhere  is the expected value operator. Note that this expression may be not defined.

Cross-covariance function 
Subtracting the mean before multiplication yields the cross-covariance between times  and :Note that this expression is not well-defined for all time series or processes, because the mean or variance may not exist.

Definition for wide-sense stationary stochastic process
Let  represent a pair of stochastic processes that are jointly wide-sense stationary. Then the cross-covariance function and the cross-correlation function are given as follows.

Cross-correlation function
 or equivalently

Cross-covariance function

The cross-correlation of a pair of jointly wide sense stationary stochastic processes can be estimated by averaging the product of samples measured from one process and samples measured from the other (and its time shifts). The samples included in the average can be an arbitrary subset of all the samples in the signal (e.g., samples within a finite time window or a sub-sampling of one of the signals). For a large number of samples, the average converges to the true cross-correlation.

Normalization 
It is common practice in some disciplines (e.g. statistics and time series analysis) to normalize the cross-correlation function to get a time-dependent Pearson correlation coefficient. However, in other disciplines (e.g. engineering) the normalization is usually dropped and the terms "cross-correlation" and "cross-covariance" are used interchangeably.

The definition of the normalized cross-correlation of a stochastic process isIf the function  is well-defined, its value must lie in the range , with 1 indicating perfect correlation and −1 indicating perfect anti-correlation.

For jointly wide-sense stationary stochastic processes, the definition isThe normalization is important both because the interpretation of the autocorrelation as a correlation provides a scale-free measure of the strength of statistical dependence, and because the normalization has an effect on the statistical properties of the estimated autocorrelations.

Properties

Symmetry property
For jointly wide-sense stationary stochastic processes, the cross-correlation function has the following symmetry property:Respectively for jointly WSS processes:

Time delay analysis
Cross-correlations are useful for determining the time delay between two signals, e.g., for determining time delays for the propagation of acoustic signals across a microphone array.  After calculating the cross-correlation between the two signals, the maximum (or minimum if the signals are negatively correlated) of the cross-correlation function indicates the point in time where the signals are best aligned; i.e., the time delay between the two signals is determined by the argument of the maximum, or arg max of the cross-correlation, as inTerminology in image processing

Zero-normalized cross-correlation (ZNCC)

For image-processing applications in which the brightness of the image and template can vary due to lighting and exposure conditions, the images can be first normalized. This is typically done at every step by subtracting the mean and dividing by the standard deviation.

In functional analysis terms, this can be thought of as the dot product of two normalized vectors.

Normalized correlation is one of the methods used for template matching, a process used for finding instances of a pattern or object within an image. It is also the 2-dimensional version of Pearson product-moment correlation coefficient.

Normalized cross-correlation (NCC)
NCC is similar to ZNCC with the only difference of not subtracting the local mean value of intensities:

Nonlinear systems 
Caution must be applied when using cross correlation for nonlinear systems. In certain circumstances, which depend on the properties of the input, cross correlation between the input and output of a system with nonlinear dynamics can be completely blind to certain nonlinear effects. This problem arises because some quadratic moments can equal zero and this can incorrectly suggest that there is little "correlation" (in the sense of statistical dependence) between two signals, when in fact the two signals are strongly related by nonlinear dynamics.

See also

 Autocorrelation
 Autocovariance
 Coherence
 Convolution
 Correlation
 Correlation function
 Cross-correlation matrix
 Cross-covariance
 Cross-spectrum
 Digital image correlation
 Phase correlation
 Scaled correlation
 Spectral density
 Wiener–Khinchin theorem

References

Further reading

External links
 Cross Correlation from Mathworld
 http://scribblethink.org/Work/nvisionInterface/nip.html
 http://www.staff.ncl.ac.uk/oliver.hinton/eee305/Chapter6.pdf

Bilinear maps
Covariance and correlation
Signal processing
Time domain analysis